The following is a list of all team-to-team transactions that have occurred in the National Hockey League during the 1979–80 NHL season. It lists what team each player has been traded to, signed by, or claimed by, and for which player(s) or draft pick(s), if applicable.

Trades between teams

May

June 

 Trade completed on June 14, 1979.
 Trade completed on August 16, 1979.

July

August

 This pick was changed to a 2nd-rd pick in 1982 NHL Entry Draft on June 11, 1980 (1980 NHL Entry Draft) day.
 This was a compensation trade.  The rights to Dale McCourt were transferred to Los Angeles as compensation to Detroit signing restricted free agent Rogatien Vachon on August 8, 1979.  McCourt refused to report to Los Angeles and sued the NHL, NHLPA, Detroit and Los Angeles. The matter was resolved and McCourt stayed with Detroit.

September

October

November 

 Trade completed on January 15, 1980.

December

January

February

March

Additional sources
 hockeydb.com - search for player and select "show trades"

References

National Hockey League transactions
1979–80 NHL season